At the 2016 federal election of the 150 House of Representatives seats the Liberal/National Coalition won 76, a one-seat majority, Labor won 69 seats and crossbenchers won the remaining five. A redistribution in 2017/18 changed the representation entitlements. For the next election, the number of seats in the House will increase to 151, South Australia will lose a seat, Victoria and the Australian Capital Territory (ACT) will gain one seat each.

The following Mackerras pendulum shows the notional margins for seats following boundary redistributions in Victoria, Queensland, South Australia, Tasmania, the Northern Territory and the ACT. Based on ABC analyst Antony Green's calculations of the effect of boundary redistributions for the next election, and the outcome of the 2018 Wentworth by-election, the pendulum has the Coalition government on 73 of 151 seats with the Labor opposition on 72 seats and a crossbench of six seats.

Assuming a theoretical nationwide uniform swing, the Labor opposition would need at least 50.7% of the two-party vote (at least a 1.1-point two-party swing) to win 76 seats and majority government. The incumbent Coalition government no longer holds a majority, and would require at least 51.1% of the two-party vote (at least a 0.7-point two-party swing) to regain it.

State of electorates
The following Mackerras pendulum lists seats in the House of Representatives according to the percentage-point margin they held on a two candidate preferred basis based on the 2016 election results. This is also known as the swing required for a seat to change hands.

Classification of seats as marginal, fairly safe or safe is applied by the independent Australian Electoral Commission using the following definition: "Where a winning party receives less than 56% of the vote, the seat is classified as 'marginal', 56–60% is classified as 'fairly safe' and more than 60% is considered 'safe'."

Notes
 Although the seats of Corangamite and Dunkley were Liberal wins at the previous election, the redistribution in Victoria changed them to notionally marginal Labor seats.

 Julia Banks won Chisholm as a Liberal candidate, and quit the Liberal party to sit as an Independent. She is not recontesting Chisholm, but she is instead contesting Flinders.

 Bean entirely consists of area from the pre-redistribution Canberra and can be considered a renaming of the seat, while the post redistribution seat of Canberra contains approximately as many voters from pre-redistribution Fenner as Canberra, and can be considered a new seat.

References

External links
National seat status (Australian Electoral Commission)

Pendulums for Australian federal elections
2019 Australian federal election